Retrospect may refer to:


Television
Retrospect (Star Trek: Voyager), a 1998 episode of Star Trek: Voyager

Music
Retrospect, a composition by Tage Nielsen (1929-2003)
Retrospect, a piano composition by Alfred Hill (composer) (1870-1960) 
Retrospect, a hymn tune by William Billings (1746-1800)
Retrospect Ensemble, a period-instrument orchestra and choir

Albums
Retrospect (Epica album)
Retrospect (Sevendust album)
Retrospect, an album by Aztec Camera
Retrospect, an album by Joe South
Retrospect, an album by Kenneth Pattengale & Joey Ryan

Computing and gaming
Retrospect (software), a family of client-server backup software applications

See also
In Retrospect (disambiguation)
Retrospective (disambiguation)